Bommel may refer to
Den Bommel, a village  in the Netherlands
 Zaltbommel, a municipality and a city in the Netherlands
 Van Bommel, a Dutch surname
Henning Bommel (born 1983), a German cyclist